Virendar Singh Kadian is an Indian lawyer and politician belonging to Aam Aadmi Party. He is a member of Seventh Legislative Assembly of Delhi from Delhi Cantt. He is also engaged as Municipal Counsel in New Delhi Municipal Council (NDMC) New Delhi.

Biography
Virender Singh Kadian born on 4 February 1975 is ex sergeant of Indian Air Force. He is a social worker and active politician. He is member of National Council of Aam Aadmi Party. He is appointed Member of Rajya Sainik Board of Govt. of NCT of Delhi and Treasurer of Governing Body of Moti Lal Nehru College (Morning and Evening) of Delhi University. He is also engaged as Municipal Counsel in New Delhi Municipal Council (NDMC) New Delhi.

He is associated with various ex servicemen associations, fighting for the cause of ex servicemen, widows of armed forces personnel and serving Armed Forces Persons. He is active in all the ex-servicemen movements fighting for their cause, for their legal rights, their welfare and settling their grievances.

Education
Virender Singh Kadian was born in middle-class family of army background. He hails from Dubaldhan (Bidhian) village in District Jhajjar Haryana. He is the eldest son of the family. His initial education was from Army School Bagdogra (West Bengal), Vaish Public School and Saint Thomas School Rohtak. He graduated from Osmania University Hyderabad with a Post Graduate Degree in Public Administration from Maharshi Dayanand University Rohtak. He also holds Bachelor in Laws (LL.B.) from Mumbai university, Master in Law (LL.M.) from Kurukshetra University and Post Graduate Diploma in Legal Drafting from Indian Law Institute, New Delhi.

Career
Virender Singh Kadian served in the Indian Air Force as a sergeant and is currently practicing as an advocate. He is actively involved in social work and politics.

Political career
He entered the politics with an aim to eradicate the deep rooted corruption from the governance and the bureaucratic system in civil society and join the Aam Aadmi Party (AAP) as founder member holding the position as a Member of National Council and President AAP Delhi Cantt. Assembly Constituency since 2012. After the resignation of Ms. Sajiya Ilmi from AAP, he was assigned a responsibility as Political Observer of RK Puram Constituency till Delhi Assembly election 2015. He contested election of Delhi Cantonment in 2015.

Being a member of ex-servicemen association he learned to take up their cases of their pension and pay fixation anomalies with concerned agencies and got relief for thousands of ex-servicemen and widows.

Timeline
2012: Joined AAP as founder member, Member of National Council and President AAP Delhi Assembly Constituency since then.

2015: Contested election of Delhi Cantonment but lost by few votes

 He was elected as a member of the Delhi Legislative Assembly from Delhi Cantt. on 11 February 2020.

Electoral performance

References 

Living people
Delhi MLAs 2020–2025
Aam Aadmi Party politicians from Delhi
Kurukshetra University alumni
Indian lawyers
Year of birth missing (living people)